The chamber barrel organ by John Langshaw in the collections of Lancashire Museums is currently on display at the
Judges' Lodgings museum in the city of Lancaster, England.

The organ was built c 1790 and is of a size suitable for use in a middle-class home. It has four ranks of pipes (stops) and three barrels. The barrels are inscribed "John Langshaw / Organ Maker / Lancaster", and are assumed to be the barrels originally housed in the instrument.
The mahogany case is attributed to Gillows, a Lancaster furniture making firm with which Langshaw is known to have collaborated.

Each of the three barrels is pinned with 10 airs. The 30 pieces preserved at Lancaster include "See the Conquering Hero Comes", the best-known number from Handel's oratorio Judas Maccabaeus. Langshaw lived in London in the years either side of Handel's death in 1759. While Lancashire Museums suggest that he knew Handel, other sources suggest that his reproductions of Handel's music began after the composer's death.

Display
The organ is currently displayed in a period setting in the Judges' Lodgings, a museum which is scheduled for closure in 2016.
Visitors are able to hear a recording of the instrument.

See also
 St John the Evangelist's Church, Lancaster

References

Objects in the Judges' Lodgings, Lancaster
Organs (music)